Robert William Hodgson (born 22 February 1973, in Launceston, Tasmania), is a former Australian cricketer, who played for Tasmania. He attended the Australian Cricket Academy in 1996, but due to injury hasn't played for Tasmania since 1999.

See also
 List of Tasmanian representative cricketers

External links
Cricinfo Profile

1973 births
Living people
Australian cricketers
Tasmania cricketers
Cricketers from Launceston, Tasmania